Thioproscaline, or 3,5-dimethoxy-4-propylthiophenethylamine, is a lesser-known psychedelic drug.  It is the 4-propylthio analog of mescaline. Thioproscaline was first synthesized by Alexander Shulgin. In his book PiHKAL (Phenethylamines i Have Known And Loved), the dosage range is listed as 20–25 mg, and the duration listed as 10–15 hours. Thioproscaline causes closed-eye visuals, slight open-eye visuals, and a body load. Very little data exists about the pharmacological properties, metabolism, and toxicity of thioproscaline.

See also 

 Phenethylamine
 Psychedelics, dissociatives and deliriants
 Mescaline
 Proscaline
 Thiomescaline

External links 
 Thioproscaline entry in PiHKAL
 Thioproscaline entry in PiHKAL • info 

Psychedelic phenethylamines
Phenol ethers
Thioethers